St. Matthew's Chapel A.M.E. Church is a historic African Methodist Episcopal church located at 309 Spruce Street in Boonville, Cooper County, Missouri. It was built in 1892, and is a one-story, rectangular, gable roofed Gothic Revival style brick church.  It has a hipped roof three story projecting tower and a rectangular, hipped roof, brick apse attached to the rear.

It was listed on the National Register of Historic Places in 1990.

References

Churches on the National Register of Historic Places in Missouri
Churches completed in 1892
African Methodist Episcopal churches in Missouri
Gothic Revival church buildings in Missouri
National Register of Historic Places in Cooper County, Missouri
1892 establishments in Missouri
Boonville, Missouri